Mikołajowice  is a village in the administrative district of Gmina Legnickie Pole, within Legnica County, Lower Silesian Voivodeship, in south-western Poland. Prior to 1945 it was in Germany.

Notable residents
Wilhelm Iwan (1871-1958), from 1911 to 1939 local Lutheran pastor

References

Villages in Legnica County